The 2016 FA WSL Cup Final was the sixth final of the FA WSL Cup, England's secondary cup competition for women's football teams and its primary league cup tournament. Manchester City defeated Birmingham 1-0 in extra time.

References

Cup
FA Women's Super League Cup finals
FA WSL Cup Final
WSLC 2016